Ribera del Fresno is a municipality located in the province of Badajoz, Extremadura, Spain. , the municipality has a population of 3,466 inhabitants.

It is the hometown of friar Juan Macias.

References

Municipalities in the Province of Badajoz